Priscilla Anne Barnes (born December 7, 1952) is an American actress. She is best known for her role as Terri Alden in the ABC sitcom Three's Company, between 1981 and 1984. Barnes also has appeared in films, including A Vacation in Hell (1979), Licence to Kill (1989), Stepfather III (1992), The Crossing Guard (1995), Mallrats (1995), The Devil's Rejects (2005), and The Visitation (2006). From 2014 to 2019, Barnes played Magda Andel in the CW comedy-drama series, Jane the Virgin.

Early life
Barnes was born December 7, 1952 (some sources list 1954 or 1955), in Fort Dix, New Jersey, the third of four children of a father who was a major in the United States Air Force and her mother a homemaker. Her childhood was marked by a series of moves across various military bases in the United States before her family settled in Lancaster, California. After graduating from Antelope Valley High School at age 17, she relocated to San Diego, working as a waitress and a dancer.

Career

Early career

Barnes's first break came when Bob Hope saw her in a local fashion show and invited her to join his troupe for a 1973 performance at Walter Reed Army Medical Center in Washington, D.C. She subsequently moved to Los Angeles to attempt a career in show business in earnest. She appeared as an Amazon in The New Original Wonder Woman alongside Lynda Carter as the title character. Her second break came at 19 when she met Peter Falk at Pips. Six months later he gave her a one-line part in an episode of Columbo, which led to a series of bit parts in films like The Seniors (1978) and Delta Fox (1979).

While working as a hostess at a Hollywood nightclub, Barnes posed nude for the "Pet of the Month" photo layout in the March 1976 issue of Penthouse magazine under the pseudonym Joann Witty. Penthouse later wanted to republish the photos under Barnes's real name in 1982 after she had become famous in Three's Company. The dispute ended up in court, as Penthouse wanted a judge to rule on the legality of publishing the pictures using her real name. At issue was a handwritten addendum to the standard model release contract that all models sign. When Penthouse lost the initial case, they appealed to the 9th Circuit Court of Appeals. The appeal court mostly sided with Barnes and ruled that the handwritten addendum was legally binding and that Penthouse could not republish the photos using her real name.

In 1976, she began studying acting with coach Sal Dano, whose students included Tom Selleck, Robert Hays and Catherine Bach. In 1978, she played a leading role in the CBS action series, The American Girls, which was canceled after seven weeks. Subsequent parts include the horror film Tintorera, and such television series as Starsky & Hutch, Vega$, Kojak, The Rockford Files, The Love Boat, the 1978 TV version of The Time Machine and the 1979 television film A Vacation in Hell. In 1980, Barnes landed a supporting role in the romantic comedy film Sunday Lovers.

Three's Company
In 1981, Barnes was cast as Terri Alden on the ABC sitcom Three's Company after Jenilee Harrison served as interim replacement to Suzanne Somers, who had left the series as a result of contractual dispute with producers. The part, which is Barnes's most notable role, brought her instant public recognition. Barnes initially auditioned for the role of Chrissy Snow in 1976, but lost the part to Somers. She stayed in the show to the series finale in 1984, appearing in a total of 70 episodes.

In the 1998 TV program E! True Hollywood Story, Barnes called Three's Company the "three worst years" of her life. Barnes revealed that after shooting a couple of episodes of the show, she felt "uncomfortable" on the set - mostly due to tension between the cast - and asked (unsuccessfully) to be released from her contract. She remained friends with co-stars Joyce DeWitt and Richard Kline, with whom she made public appearances. Barnes was portrayed by actress Anne Ross in the 2003 television movie Behind the Camera: The Unauthorized Story of Three's Company.

Later career
In 1982, Barnes starred in Aaron Spelling made-for-television film The Wild Women of Chastity Gulch. After Three's Company was cancelled by ABC in 1984, Barnes began appearing in guest-starring roles on television shows, including Hotel; Murder, She Wrote and Highway to Heaven. In 1987, she starred in the pilot for the sitcom She's the Sheriff, playing the title role. Barnes later left the project and was replaced by Suzanne Somers. The following year, Barnes returned in a starring role in the action comedy Traxx opposite Shadoe Stevens.

In 1989, Barnes appeared in the James Bond film Licence to Kill as Della Churchill, and in the underwater sci-fi/action thriller Lords of the Deep. In 1992, she starred in the NBC television movie Perry Mason and the Case of the Reckless Romeo, with Raymond Burr, and in the horror film Stepfather III. In 1995, she appeared in the cult comedy film Mallrats, and The Crossing Guard opposite Jack Nicholson and directed by Sean Penn. Barnes made cameo appearance in the 1999 comedy-drama film Mumford, and appeared in many other smaller independent and made-for-television movies during 1990s and 2000s. Her most notable role was in the 2005 horror film  The Devil's Rejects directed by Rob Zombie.   Her other credits include  Thr3e (2006), The Visitation (2006), and American Cowslip (2009). In 2012, she co-starred as "Vicey Hatfield" in Hatfields and McCoys: Bad Blood. In 2013, she appeared in Disaster Wars: Earthquake vs Tsunami. In 2007 Barnes appeared at the annual New York International Fringe Festival as Hillary Clinton in Nick Salamone's play Hillary Agonistes. 

In 2014, Barnes was cast in an recurring role as Magda Andel, Petra's (played by Yael Grobglas) mother, in the CW comedy-drama series Jane the Virgin. The series ended in 2019 after five seasons. Barnes appeared in a total of 41 episodes. In 2019 Barnes appeared in the Bloomington Playwrights Project's production of Christy Hall's To Quiet the Quiet.

Personal life
Barnes married actor Ted Monte. In 2012, they purchased a home in Glendale, California.

Filmography

Film

Television

References

External links

 
 
 
 

1954 births
Actresses from California
American film actresses
American stage actresses
American television actresses
Living people
People from Lancaster, California
20th-century American actresses
21st-century American actresses
Antelope Valley High School alumni